Glutops is a genus of flies in the family Pelecorhynchidae.

Species
Glutops bandus Teskey, 1970
Glutops compactus Teskey, 1970
Glutops esakii Nagatomi & Saigusa, 1970
Glutops itoi (Nagatomi, 1955)
Glutops medius Teskey, 1970
Glutops melanderi Teskey, 1970
Glutops punctatus Wirth, 1954
Glutops rossi Pechuman, 1945
Glutops semicanus Krivosheina, 1971
Glutops semiformis Nagatomi & Saigusa, 1970
Glutops singularis Burgess, 1878

References

Tabanoidea genera
Pelecorhynchidae
Diptera of North America
Diptera of Asia